Romeyleh-ye Sofla (also Romanized as Romeyleh-ye Soflá; also known as Romeyleh-ye Pā’īn) is a village in Azadeh Rural District, Moshrageh District, Ramshir County, Khuzestan Province, Iran. At the 2006 census, its population was 137, in 21 families.

References 

Populated places in Ramshir County